Andrew Lloyd Webber is an English composer.

He is an EGOT winner, having won a Primetime Emmy Award, three Grammy Awards, an Academy Award (Oscar), and six Tony Awards.

Webber is known for his various stage work Joseph and the Amazing Technicolor Dreamcoat (1968), Jesus Christ Superstar (1970), Evita (1976), Cats (1981), The Phantom of the Opera (1986), Sunset Boulevard (1993), and School of Rock (2015).

Major awards

Academy Awards

British Academy Film Awards

Golden Globes Awards

Grammy Awards

Laurence Olivier Awards

Primetime Emmy Awards

Tony Awards

Miscellaneous awards

Drama Desk Awards

Gold Derby Awards

Online Film & Television Association Awards

Satellite Awards

World Soundtrack Awards

Special honors

American Theater Hall of Fame

Hollywood Walk of Fame

Kennedy Center Honors

Songwriters Hall of Fame

Other awards
 1984: Variety Club of Great Britain Awards Special Award.
 1995: Praemium Imperiale
 1997: Variety Club of Great Britain Awards Outstanding Contribution to Showbusiness.
 2008: Brit Award for Outstanding Contribution to Music
 2008: Woodrow Wilson Award for Public Service
 2014: Ivor Novello Awards from the British Academy of Songwriters, Composers and Authors
 2019: Golden Plate Award of the American Academy of Achievement

References

Awards
Lloyd Webber, Andrew